Harold Matthews was an Australian rules footballer.

Harold Matthews may also refer to:

Harold Matthews Cup
Harold Matthews (rugby league) for Balmain Tigers

See also
Harold Mathews Brett
Harry Matthews (disambiguation)
Matthews (surname)